Legatum Limited, also known as Legatum, is a private investment firm, headquartered in Dubai, United Arab Emirates. Legatum is a partnership that uses its own funds to invest globally. The firm also invests in activities to promote entrepreneurship and free enterprise as well as anti-slavery, health and education initiatives.

History and business activities
Legatum (meaning "legacy" or "gift") is a private investment firm based in Dubai using only capital provided by members of the firm. Legatum was founded in December 2006 in the United Arab Emirates by Christopher Chandler, who made his fortune in markets undergoing political transitions. Previously, Chandler was the president of Sovereign Global, or Sovereign, which he co-founded with his brother Richard Chandler in 1986. Sovereign invested capital in companies located in Asia, Africa, Latin America and Eastern Europe, and in industries including telecommunications, electric utilities, steel, oil and gas, banking and oil refining. The Chandler brothers embarked on separate ventures following the de-merger of Sovereign in 2006. Christopher Chandler established Legatum the following December. In 2012, Legatum purchased a building in the Dubai International Financial Centre for its global headquarters. The building was renamed Legatum Plaza, and the company moved into the building the following year.

In 2015, Legatum transitioned to a partnership, consisting of Christopher Chandler, Mark Stoleson, Philip Vassiliou and Alan McCormick, providing a structure for the firm to continue operating beyond its founders.

Investments
The firm's investment activities tend to focus on globally listed companies, markets in economic transition (such as Japan or China), or distressed situations.

Legatum was one of the first foreign commercial investors to identify the need to provide critical equity capital to for-profit microfinance organizations in India, investing $25 million for a majority stake in SHARE Microfinance, India's leading microfinance institution.

In 2006, the company co-founded an early charity crowdfunding platform, Razoo Global Corporation, based in Alexandria, VA. The platform has raised US$550 million in crowdfunding since its establishment. It announced a management buy-out of Legatum's holding in 2017.

In 2007, Legatum purchased a significant minority stake in Intellecap, which provides consultancy advice to companies in Asia and Africa, and which it subsequently sold back to its owner, the Aavishkaar Group, in 2017.

In 2008, Legatum and Omidyar Network, a philanthropic investment firm founded by Pierre Omidyar, collaborated to co-invest a total of $40 million into Unitus Equity Fund II (now known as Elevar Equity). The fund is a commercial venture providing capital to businesses targeted at serving the poor in the developing world. In 2021, Legatum invested in GB News, a new UK TV channel.

Also in 2021, Legatum invested in Mobile Premier League, an esports and gaming platform.

Support to other entities and schemes
As of 2014, Legatum had invested around US$80 million in 1,440 projects in 107 countries. Legatum focuses on three core areas of philanthropic investment: development, entrepreneurship, and policy innovation.

Development
Legatum Foundation is the development arm of Legatum and invests in community-based organizations and projects around the world to help the poorest and most marginalized people and populations in society. In 2015, Legatum established the Luminos Fund, a private donor philanthropic fund designed to develop and scale initiatives which promote education by helping out-of-school children get back to school. The 2020 expansion of the Speed School Programme to Ethiopia was funded by the Foundation. During the coronavirus pandemic of 2020, Luminos worked with Syrian refugees to offer educational support and therapeutic interventions for school-aged children. By February 2020, the Luminos Fund had provided education for 132,611 children in Ethiopia, Lebanon and Liberia, whose access had been limited due to conflict, discrimination or poverty.

Legatum founded the END Fund in 2012 to co-ordinate and support programmes to treat neglected tropical diseases, which affect over 1.5 billion people globally. Legatum first started funding NTD work in 2006, after Legatum partner Alan McCormick visited Professor Alan Fenwick (Professor of Tropical Parasitology) at Imperial College London, who in turn had founded the Schistosomiasis Control Initiative in 2002. It has since led to Legatum investing over $10m in efforts to eliminate NTDs. Legatum has also funded more than one thousand community-based health initiatives that are solving common concerns in the developing world, like blindness and agricultural harm.

In 2013, in partnership with Humanity United and Walk Free, Legatum established a $100 million fund called the Freedom Fund. The aim of the fund is to help eradicate modern day slavery, an illegal industry that generates over $32 billion in profits every year around the world. Prior to the founding of the Fund, Legatum sponsored a 2012 information-gathering trip for non-profit organizations in Nepal and India to learn more about the human trafficking and slave-trade industries there.

Entrepreneurship
In 2007, Legatum established The Legatum Center for Entrepreneurship at MIT with the aim to create a generation of business leaders in developing countries by providing them with the skills needed to succeed as entrepreneurs. Fellowships are granted to students who show entrepreneurial ambition and an interest in making a lasting and positive economic impact on low-income countries.

Throughout 2017, the Center had distributed over $7 million to 213 fellows and launched enterprises across 40 countries. The Legatum fellows have pursued businesses that tackle social issues such as improving sanitation by converting waste products into fertiliser in Kenya, establishing plastic recycling businesses in Nigeria, and improving the clothing industry's conditions in Tanzania.

Legatum established the annual Africa Awards for Entrepreneurship program, which recognises and rewards business leaders who serve as role models to Africa's aspiring entrepreneurs. The scheme has been in operation since 2007 and is now run by the African Leadership Network, with Legatum still involved as a lead sponsor.

In 2008, Legatum partnered with Fortune magazine to announce the Legatum Fortune Technology Prize, a $1 million award intended to reward for-profit businesses who provide products and services to the needy through the use of technology.

In 2013, Legatum launched the Centre for Entrepreneurs (CFE) in partnership with Luke Johnson to promote and support entrepreneurs in the UK.

Policy

Legatum Foundation is a sponsor of the Legatum Institute, an independent non-partisan policy, advisory and advocacy organization based in London.

References

External links 
Official website
Legatum Foundation
Legatum Institute Foundation
Legatum Center for Entrepreneurship at MIT

Venture capital firms
Emirati companies established in 2006
Financial services companies established in 2006
Investment companies of the United Arab Emirates
Companies based in Dubai